Martin Sechkov (born 17 November 1986) is a former Bulgarian footballer, who played as a defender.

He played as a centre back from 2002 to 2019, amassing over 120 appearances in the Bulgarian First League for Lokomotiv Plovdiv, Akademik Sofia, Slavia Sofia, Montana and Neftochimic Burgas. He also played for Velbazhd Kyustendil, Minyor Pernik, Etar 1924, Pirin Razlog, Septemvri Simitli, Sozopol and Hebar Pazardzhik.

References

External links
 
 

1986 births
Living people
Bulgarian footballers
First Professional Football League (Bulgaria) players
PFC Velbazhd Kyustendil players
PFC Lokomotiv Plovdiv players
PFC Minyor Pernik players
Akademik Sofia players
PFC Slavia Sofia players
FC Hebar Pazardzhik players
FC Etar 1924 Veliko Tarnovo players
FC Montana players
Neftochimic Burgas players
FC Septemvri Simitli players
FC Sozopol players
Association football defenders
People from Kyustendil
Sportspeople from Kyustendil Province